The 2004 Montana gubernatorial election took place on November 2, 2004 for the post of Governor of Montana. Democrat Brian Schweitzer defeated Montana Secretary of State and Republican nominee Bob Brown with 50.4% of the vote against 46%. Schweitzer formed a ticket with a Republican running mate, choosing state legislator John Bohlinger for the lieutenant governorship.

Democratic primary

Candidates
Brian Schweitzer, rancher, former United States Department of Agriculture employee, nominee for the United States Senate in 2000
Running mate: John Bohlinger, former State Representative (1993–1999) and State Senator (1999–2005)
John Vincent, former State Representative (1975–1990), former Speaker of the Montana House of Representatives (1985–1986; 1989–1990) and former Mayor of Bozeman (1994–1995)
Running mate: Mary Sexton, Teton County Commissioner

Brian Schweitzer, a rancher from Whitefish, began campaigning for the Democratic nomination over a year before the primary. He had narrowly lost the Senate race to Conrad Burns in 2000. In February 2004 he announced that liberal Republican State Senator John Bohlinger would be his running mate for the post of lieutenant governor. This would be the first bipartisan gubernatorial team since the Montana Constitution was amended in 1972 to require governors and lieutenant governors to run as a team.

In March 2004, John Vincent, a former Speaker of the Montana House of Representatives, entered the race and criticized Schweitzer for taking both sides on some issues. In the end Schweitzer easily won the Democratic primary. Three days after the primary Schweitzer addressed the Montana Democratic Convention; he gave a bear hug to his defeated rival and said he would bring a new kind of leadership to Montana.

Republican primary

Candidates
Bob Brown, Secretary of State of Montana (2001–2005), former State Representative (1970–1974) and former State Senator (1974–1996)
Running mate: Dave Lewis, State Representative (2001–2005)
 Pat Davison, conservative businessman
Running mate: David Mihalic, former Superintendent of Glacier National Park (1994–1999) and Yosemite National Park (1999–2002) for the National Park Service and former adviser to Marc Racicot
Ken Miller, former State Senator (1995–2003) and former Montana Republican Party Chairman (2001–2003)
Running mate: Wayne Buchanan, former executive secretary for the Montana Board of Public Education
 Tom Keating, former State Senator (1981–2001)
Running mate: Matt Brainard, Montana Public Service Commissioner and former State Representative (1995–2001)

Incumbent Governor Judy Martz had a difficult term of office with her approval ratings as governor going as low as 20%. In August 2003 she announced she would not run for re-election as she wanted to spend more time with her family. Lieutenant Governor Karl Ohs was expected to enter the Republican primary race but decided not to.

Montana Secretary of State Bob Brown, conservative businessman Pat Davison and former State Senators Ken Miller and Tom Keating competed for the nomination. Brown was seen as the favorite in the primary but was attacked by Pat Davison for being "liberal on taxes". Brown was the only one of the candidates who refused to sign a pledge not to raise taxes as he said he wanted to keep all options open as governor.

General election

Campaign

In mid summer polls showed Schweitzer had a 10-point lead over Brown, but by October the gap had closed to only 4 percent.

Schweitzer campaigned with plans to lift Montana from its position at the bottom of all 50 states in wages. He called for new uses to be found for crops like mint and for small businesses to pool in purchasing health care. He also supported opening the border with Canada to allow consumers to get cheaper prescription drugs from Canada.

Brown said that the Democrats harmed business growth and job creation. He touted his government experience including 26 years in the Montana legislature and accused Schweitzer of taking hypocritical stands.

Schweitzer won the election to become the first Democrat in 20 years to win an election for governor. According to the exit polls Schweitzer obtained two-thirds of the vote from over 65s and from independent voters. This was despite President George W. Bush winning Montana very easily over John Kerry.

Predictions

Statewide results

References

See also

Montana
Gubernatorial
2004